Malaysia competed in the 1973 Southeast Asian Peninsular Games held in Bangkok, Thailand from 1 to 8 September 1973.

Medal summary

Medals by sport

Medallists

References

1973